Hunawihr is a commune in the Haut-Rhin department in Grand Est in north-eastern France.

The village is a member of the Les Plus Beaux Villages de France ("The most beautiful villages of France") association.

See also
 Communes of the Haut-Rhin département

References

Communes of Haut-Rhin
Plus Beaux Villages de France